The British Philatelic Bulletin was the official publication of the Royal Mail aimed at stamp collectors.

The Bulletin gave detailed information about future British stamp issues and also featured articles about past issues from noted philatelists.

History
The Bulletin was first published in September 1963, not long after the formation of the Philatelic Bureau on 1 May, and was a monthly publication almost from the start. Early editions were simple publications, type-written on Bureau notepaper in A4 size. Later editions were professionally produced in colour in A5 size. Originally it was published by the GPO and then by Royal Mail. The Royal Philatelic Society London has a complete archive of this publication and its index is available online.

The final issue of the Bulletin appeared in August 2022, completing the 59th volume.

Editors
The editor at the time the Bulletin closed was Chloe Tuck. The precious editor was Tim Noble,. The philatelist John Holman served as editor from 1988 to 2010, after which Kathryn Reilly took the reins. Previous editors included William Doherty, Frank Langfield, Archie Page, Frank Brench, John Memmott, Charles Gowen and Douglas Muir.

Postmark Bulletin
A sister publication has been produced since 1971 known as the Postmark Bulletin which provides a guide to upcoming British commemorative postmarks.

References

External links
Royal Mail British Philatelic Bulletin
Royal Mail British Philatelic Bulletin Subscriptions
Royal Mail British Philatelic Bulletin Archive showing every issue since September 1963

1963 establishments in the United Kingdom
Philatelic periodicals
Monthly magazines published in the United Kingdom
Magazines established in 1963
English-language magazines